Apollon the Mighty (February 21, 1862 – 18 October 1928), born Louis Uni, was a French strongman, especially famous for his grip strength.

Biography

Early life

Louis Uni was born at eight o'clock in the morning on February 21, 1862, at no. 18 on the boulevard that today bears his name (Boulevard Louis Uni in Marsillargues) in the house his father Jean-Jacques Uni had built in 1845. He was the son of Jacques and Elisabeth (née Brémond) and was descended from a family of locally well-known giants. His grandfather Jacques Uni, born in 1772, was 2.03 m (6 feet and 8 inches) tall, while the average male height in France in 1800 was only 163.7 cm (5 feet and 4.45 inches).

Aged 14 he ran away from his parents' house and joined the traveling Italian circus ‘Caramagne’ at Lunel near his home town. During a performance, the police seized him and returned him to his father. Eventually his parents allowed him to leave home and work with Felix Bernard and Pietro Dalmasso. He also worked with Henri Pechon and August "the Butcher". He completed his military service aged 20.

Uni took over the Café Fontaine in Paris, and after renovating it named it ‘Concert Apollon’ and began to put on theatrical programmes with athletic acts thrown in. Eventually, he had to relinquish the theatre, losing a considerable sum in the process. Uni was a friend and protégé of academic and champion of physical education Edmond Desbonnet.

Career as a wrestler and strongman

In 1889 Uni took part in a Greco-Roman wrestling competition at the International Athletic Arenas in Bordeaux:

‘This Tuesday evening... is the first representation of the competition of the French champions: Bernard, Crest, etc, and Apollon, the king of human strength... Finally, strength exercises will be performed by the celebrated Apollon, who has not yet met his equal, and has given himself the just title: the king of human strength. Apollon will lift his famous weight of 80 kilos to arm’s length... Apollon is truly the strongest man we have seen for a long time. In a pinch, between two fingers, he lifts a weight of 80 kilos. He is the most beautiful sample of an athlete that exists in the world. His perfect form and his face make one think of the gladiators of Roman antiquity.’

Also in 1889 Uni competed against Batta (Charles Estienne 1866-1939) in Lille using 118 kilo train-car wheels (with an enormous axle which was much too thick even for the hands of Batta). Batta could only lift it to his shoulders, resting it lightly on his chest for a minute. Apollon was reported to have lifted the weight easily. Part of Uni's stage act was called ‘Escaping Prisoner’, during which he would bend the tempered iron bars of a cage through which he would then pass. He performed this routine at the Folies Bergère, among other venues. In December 1889 he appeared at the Royal Aquarium in London.

In about 1892 he married Josephine, with whom he had a daughter, but the marriage did not last, and after their divorce, she married Castanet, a famous animal trainer. On December 18, 1892, at the Théâtre des Variétésin Lille in France Uni cleaned and jerked a 155 kilogram double barbell, with two weighted globes on each end of the bar. He then found the balance point and neatly slid the barbell onto one hand while lifting one leg at a right angle. Then he let the barbell fall from overhead and caught it in the bend of his arms before placing it on the ground. In 1896 he was standing at about 6'3" and weighing 265 lbs. with 18" forearms and nearly 10" wrists.

Apollon's Wheels
One of the most known legends about Apollon is his 166 kilogram (366 lbs) barbell called Apollon's Wheels, with two railway car wheels on both sides as the name indicates, that he procured special-made for himself in 1892. Although popularly thought to be his main feat, there is no clear record of him actually being able to clean and jerk it himself. The first men to have conclusively clean and jerked it were Charles Rigoulot at Paris on March 3, 1930, and John Davis on September 13, 1949, at Paris and Norbert Schemansky in October 1954 at Lille. It is an important piece of strongman history, and it's still popular today as a feat of strength for its three notable features that made it hard to lift: the thick, nearly 2-inch diameter of the bar, its smooth surface and the wheels not revolving. The original Apollon's Wheels are exhibited at Musée National du Sport.

Accident and later life

In 1913 Uni met with a severe accident during a performance in Vichy in France. When attempting to hold back two motorcars with outstretched hands he cried out in pain and suddenly dropped to the ground, having torn the muscles of his arms and burst a blood vessel. By 1923 he was looking for work as a 'right hand man' and appeared in the silent film Mare Nostrum (1926) cast in the role of "Triton". By 1928 aged 66 he was still exhibiting his strength in traveling shows.

He died in Evreux in 1928 aged 66.

Legacy

The French Surrealist poet René Char, being a Southerner and a 1.92 m rugby player, was also an admirer of Louis Uni and addressed to him his famous poem "The Tomb of secrets" in Le Soleil des eaux (Le Tombeau des secrets).

References

External links
 
Early French Culture Physique photography by Professor Edmond Desbonnet & others
Uni on David Horne's 'World of Grip' website
Full text of Edmond Desbonnet's 'Apollon, The Emperor of Athletes’ Iron Game History (August 1997)

1862 births
1928 deaths
French bodybuilders
French male professional wrestlers
French strength athletes
People associated with physical culture